Alsophila erinacea, synonym Cyathea erinacea, is a species of tree fern native to Mexico, Costa Rica, Panama, Venezuela, Colombia, Ecuador, Peru and Bolivia.

Description
The arching fronds are bipinnate, up to 3.5 m long and form a sparse crown. The rachis and stipe are scaly and may be either straw-coloured or brown to dark brown. The scales are bicoloured, having a dark brown to blackish centre and pale whitish margin, as well as a terminal seta. Characteristically of this species, pinnule veins bear whitish scales with star-shaped setae. Sori are round and form on either side of the pinnule midvein. They are covered by globose indusia.

References

erinacea
Ferns of the Americas
Ferns of Mexico
Flora of Costa Rica
Flora of Panama
Flora of Venezuela
Flora of Colombia
Flora of Ecuador
Flora of Peru
Flora of Bolivia